CHP may refer to:

Law enforcement
 California Highway Patrol

Politics
 Christian Heritage Party (disambiguation)
 Christian Historical Party
 Republican People's Party (Turkey)  (Turkish: Cumhuriyet Halk Partisi)

Chemistry and biology
Collagen hybridizing peptide
CHP (gene)
Chp (GTPase)
Cumene hydroperoxide
Capillary hydrostatic pressure, a component of the Starling equation
N-cyclohexyl-2-pyrrolidone (liquid solvent)
Chemical formula of Methylidynephosphane

Energy
 Combined heat and power, a power plant using a heat engine to generate electricity and useful heat simultaneously.

Healthcare
 UPMC Children's Hospital of Pittsburgh
 Community Health Partnerships, Scotland
 Certified Health Physicist, a board certification for specialists in radiation protection and safety
 Centre for Health Protection, an agency of Hong Kong

Other
 Cultural Heritage Park, a cultural center in Taichung, Taiwan
 Ferrocarril Chihuahua al Pacífico railway, reporting mark
 Covering homotopy property